Fenimorea tessellata is a species of sea snail, a marine gastropod mollusc in the family Drilliidae.

Description
The length of this marine shell varies between 16 mm and 40 mm.

Distribution
This marine species occurs in the Caribbean Sea off Mexico; off Florida, USA

References

External links
  Fallon P.J. (2016). Taxonomic review of tropical western Atlantic shallow water Drilliidae (Mollusca: Gastropoda: Conoidea) including descriptions of 100 new species. Zootaxa. 4090(1): 1–363
 

tessellata
Gastropods described in 2016